Antonio Natali (born 1951) is an Italian art historian, academic and museum director. Born in Piombino, he headed several departments at the Uffizi from 1981 onwards before becoming its director from 2006 until 2015.

He and Carlo Falciani curated three exhibitions on 16th century Florentine art at the Palazzo Strozzi. From 2000 to 2010 he taught museology at the University of Perugia. In 2006 he became professor of modern art history at Milan Poytechnic. He is now an advisor at the Opera del Duomo di Firenze and an independent curator.

References

Uffizi
1951 births
People from Piombino
Italian art historians
Directors of the Uffizi
Living people
Academic staff of the Polytechnic University of Milan
Academic staff of the University of Perugia